Ancylodiscoididae is a family of flatworms belonging to the order Dactylogyridea.

Genera

Genera:
 Anchylodiscus Johnston & Tiegs, 1922
 Ancylodiscoides Yamaguti, 1937
 Bagrobdella Paperna, 1969

References

Platyhelminthes